Herencsény is a village and municipality in the comitat of Nógrád, Hungary.

Etymology
The  name is of Slavic origin and comes from Slovak Chrěnčany ("chren" - horseradish). See also etymology of Hriňová.

References

Populated places in Nógrád County